Hygrotus artus was a species of beetle in family Dytiscidae. It was endemic to the United States. It was only known from the Mono Lake, California, area. Its common name was the Mono Lake Diving Beetle.

References

Sources

†
†
†
Extinct beetles
Extinct insects since 1500
Taxonomy articles created by Polbot